The 1950 Sun Bowl was a college football postseason bowl game between the Texas Western Miners and the Georgetown Hoyas.

Background
The Miners finished 3rd in the Border Conference in Curtice's final year with the team, as they tried to get their first Sun Bowl victory. This was Georgetown's second and final bowl game.

Game summary
2nd quarter
Chesak 1-yard run (kick failed) - UTEP 6-0
Gabrel 1-yard run (Haesler kick) - UTEP 13-0

3rd quarter
Fraser 32-yard run (Davis kick) UTEP 13-7
Kivas 3-yard run (Haesler kick) UTEP 20-7

4th quarter
Gabrel 19-yard run (kick blocked) - UTEP 26-7
Schmidt 14-yard pass from Deacon (kick failed) - UTEP 26-13
Hansen 51-yard kickoff return (Davis kick) - UTEP 33-13
Fornaciari 54-yard pass from Deacon (Haesler kick) - UTEP 33-20

Aftermath
The Miners made four Sun Bowls in the decade, along with two more in the next decade. Curtice left for Utah after the game.

Statistics

References

Sun Bowl
Sun Bowl
Georgetown Hoyas football bowl games
UTEP Miners football bowl games
January 1950 sports events in the United States
Sun Bowl